Richard Annesley, 2nd Earl Annesley PC (Ire) (14 April 1745 – 9 November 1824), styled The Honourable from 1758 to 1802, was an Anglo-Irish politician and noble.

Lord Annesley was educated at Trinity College Dublin. He was the second son of William Annesley, 1st Viscount Glerawly and Lady Anne Beresford. He inherited the earldom created for his childless brother through the terms of the special remainder, as well as the viscountcy which had been created for his father, in 1802. He represented Coleraine in the Irish House of Commons from 1776 to 1783 and then St Canice to 1790. Subsequently, he sat for Newtownards until 1798, when Annesley was elected for Fore and Blessington. He chose the latter constituency and sat for it until 1800. In this year, he stood for Clogher and Midleton, which he represented until the Act of Union in 1801. He served as High Sheriff of Down in 1783.

He married Anne Lambert on 25 September 1771 and with her had six children:
William Richard Annesley, 3rd Earl Annesley (1772–1838)
Hon. Robert Annesley (1773–1825)
Lt.-Gen. Arthur Grove-Annesley (1774–1849)
Captain Francis Charles Annesley (1775–1832)
 Catherine O'Donnell née Annesley (1776–1830)
 Anna Maria born (1778 –

References

thePeerage.com

1745 births
1824 deaths
High Sheriffs of Down
Irish MPs 1776–1783
Irish MPs 1783–1790
Irish MPs 1790–1797
Irish MPs 1798–1800
Members of the Privy Council of Ireland
Richard
18th-century Anglo-Irish people
Members of the Parliament of Ireland (pre-1801) for County Tyrone constituencies
Members of the Parliament of Ireland (pre-1801) for County Kilkenny constituencies
Members of the Parliament of Ireland (pre-1801) for County Down constituencies
Members of the Parliament of Ireland (pre-1801) for County Wicklow constituencies
Members of the Parliament of Ireland (pre-1801) for County Westmeath constituencies
Members of the Parliament of Ireland (pre-1801) for County Cork constituencies
2
Alumni of Trinity College Dublin